Kay Lertsittichai (also known under the pseudonym Kayavine, born 12 December 1996) is a Thai YouTuber and actor. He began making YouTube videos in 2016 and has more than one million subscribers . He recently portrayed a main role as Gunkan in GMMTV's Who Are You (2020).

Early life and education 
Kay was born in Nakhon Pathom, Thailand. He started his secondary education in  where he got the opportunity to become an international exchange student to Guilford High School in Illinois, United States.

In 2019, he graduated with a bachelor's degree in mathematics with emphasis on actuarial science from University of Wisconsin–Whitewater.

Filmography

Film

Television

References

External links 

 

1996 births
Living people
Kay Lertsittichai
Kay Lertsittichai
Kay Lertsittichai
Kay Lertsittichai
University of Wisconsin–Whitewater alumni
Kay Lertsittichai